is a 1992 Sega Genesis/Mega Drive fishing video game that was developed by HOT・B/Sage's Creation and was released by Vic Tokai in North America. It was due for release in Europe by July, but the plan was cancelled.

Gameplay
Players participate in a big fishing derby; and spend a day catching as many king salmon as possible. Many activities of real-life fishing are included like driving the boat, assembling the lure onto the fishing rod and overcome a motley crew of fishermen at the same time.

As players become successful in catching fish, they become stronger and more adept fishermen themselves. This system operates similar to a role-playing video game. Players can choose between a leisurely fishing trip that involves the aspect of fishing on a sunny afternoon or a championship mode where the game's story takes effect. One of the settings in the game is Vancouver Island; one of the places where king salmon are abundant.

Passwords allow players to resume where they left off.

References

External links

1992 video games
Fishing video games
Hot B games
Sega Genesis games
Sega Genesis-only games
Top-down video games
Vic Tokai games
Video games developed in Japan
Video games scored by Masaharu Iwata